Plougoumelen is a commune in the Morbihan department and Brittany region of north-western France. In French the inhabitants of Plougoumelen are known as Plougoumelenois.

See also
Communes of the Morbihan department

References

External links

 Mayors of Morbihan Association 

Communes of Morbihan